Don Valley East is a federal electoral district in Ontario, Canada that covers the northeast section of the North York part of Toronto. The federal riding was created in 1976 from parts of Willowdale, York East, York North, and York—Scarborough ridings.

It is represented in the House of Commons of Canada by Liberal MP Michael Coteau. He was formerly the Ontario Liberal MPP for the contiguous provincial riding.

Geography
This riding is located in the eastern part of the North York district in Toronto. It contains the neighbourhoods of Flemingdon Park, Don Mills, Graydon Hall, Parkwoods and Victoria Village.

History
For most of its existence, this riding has alternated between voting Liberal and Conservative. During the Brian Mulroney years, it elected Progressive Conservatives but it switched to Liberal when Jean Chrétien came to power. In 2011, when Stephen Harper's Conservative Party won a majority government, the riding switched back to Conservative.

In 2018 the Don Valley East Collective was created to organize & inform residents around important issues that impact our daily lives; this group spans all of the neighbourhoods within Don Valley East.

Robocall controversy 

Don Valley East was one of the seven federal ridings for which the election results were being challenged in court because of automated phone calls ("robocalls") that voters say tried to misdirect them to wrong polling stations. According to the challenger's claims, phone calls claiming to be on behalf of Elections Canada directed some voters to the wrong polling station during the election. It is illegal under the Elections Act to impersonate Elections Canada and to interfere with somebody's right to vote.

In October 2012, however, Don Valley East was dropped from the legal case after it was found that Leeanne Bielli, the voter who brought the challenge forward, did not live in the riding. Bielli therefore became ineligible to challenge the result. Joe Daniel remained the Member of Parliament for Don Valley East until the 2015 federal election.

Boundaries

As of changes made in 2003, the riding boundaries consisted of:
 on the east by Victoria Park Avenue,
 on the north by the hydroelectric transmission line situated north of Apache Trail running west from Victoria Park Avenue to Highway No. 404, then along that highway to Finch Avenue East, and west along Finch Avenue to Leslie Street;
on the west by Leslie Street as far as the Canadian National Railway, then by the railway to Don Mills Road, then south along Don Mills Road to the Canadian Pacific Railway, then northeast along the railway to the Don River East Branch, and south along the Don River to just west of Sunrise Avenue, and
on the south by Sunrise Avenue.

This riding underwent significant changes during the 2012 electoral redistribution. It lost almost half of its territory to Don Valley North and gained a significant portion of Don Valley West.

Former boundaries

Demographics 
According to the Canada 2021 Census

Ethnic groups: 36.1% White, 18.3% South Asian, 10.5% Black, 7.7% Chinese, 7.6% Filipino, 5.9% West Asian, 3.8% Arab, 2.4% Latin American, 1.4% Korean

Languages: 44.0% English, 3.6% Tagalog, 3.5% Arabic, 3.1% Mandarin, 2.7% Urdu, 2.3% Spanish, 2.2% Cantonese, 2.1% Greek, 2.0% Dari, 2.0% Gujarati, 1.6% Persian, 1.3% Romanian, 1.2% Tamil, 1.2% Bengali, 1.1% Hindi, 1.0% Korean

Religions: 47.9% Christian (19.9% Catholic, 7.7% Christian Orthodox, 2.4% Anglican, 2.0% United Church, 1.2% Presbyterian, 1.1% Pentecostal, 13.6% Other), 22.3% Muslim, 4.5% Hindu, 1.2% Buddhist, 22.1% None

Median income: $36,400 (2020)

Average income: $50,680 (2020)

Members of Parliament

This riding has elected the following Members of Parliament:

Election results

2003 boundaries

1996 boundaries

1987 boundaries

1976  boundaries

See also
 List of Canadian federal electoral districts
 Past Canadian electoral districts

References

Federal riding history from the Library of Parliament
2011 Results from Elections Canada
 Campaign expense data from Elections Canada

Notes

Federal electoral districts of Toronto
Ontario federal electoral districts
1976 establishments in Ontario